Tyshun Raequan "Deebo" Samuel  (born January 15, 1996) is an American football wide receiver for the San Francisco 49ers of the National Football League (NFL). He played college football at South Carolina and was selected by the 49ers in the second round of the 2019 NFL Draft. In 2021, he was selected to the Pro Bowl and received first-team All-Pro honors.

Early years
Samuel attended Chapman High School in Inman, South Carolina, where he played high school football and was coached by Mark Hodge. As a senior, he led his team to the semifinals of the AAA playoffs. During his career, Samuel had 166 catches for 2,751 yards and 36 touchdowns; he rushed 133 times for 898 yards and 13 touchdowns. He finished with a record 53 career touchdowns, 94 tackles and 12 interceptions. He won the High School Sports Report Class AAA Offensive Player of the Year, and played in the Shrine Bowl of the Carolinas. Samuel was rated as a three-star recruit by the 247 composite. He committed to the University of South Carolina to play college football.

College career

2014 season
Samuel redshirted in his true freshman year of 2014.

2015 season
Samuel played in five games total, making three starts and struggling with injuries. He suffered a hamstring injury in the season opener against North Carolina. Samuel finished the season with 12 receptions for 161 yards.

2016 season
In his sophomore season, Samuel played in 10 games, led the team with 59 receptions for 783 yards, and rushed 15 times for 98 yards and six touchdowns. In the Birmingham Bowl against USF, he had 14 receptions for 190 receiving yards.

2017 season
In the first game of the season against NC State, Samuel  returned the opening kickoff for a touchdown and had five catches for 83 yards for two touchdowns. In Week 2 against Missouri, Samuel once again returned a kickoff for a touchdown, and finished with five catches for 45 yards, and also ran the ball two times for 30 yards and a touchdown. In Week 3 against Kentucky, on the first play from scrimmage Samuel caught a 68-yard touchdown pass from Gamecock quarterback Jake Bentley. After suffering a season-ending injury later in the game, Samuel would finish the season having not even played three full games, yet accumulated 250 yards receiving for three touchdowns, two carries for 30 yards and a touchdown, and two kickoff returns for two touchdowns for a combined 194 yards.

Injury
In Week 3 against Kentucky, with 2:27 left in the third quarter, Samuel caught a pass from Jake Bentley and was awkwardly tackled by Derrick Baity Jr. of Kentucky, bending his leg back. It was announced after the game by head coach Will Muschamp that Samuel had broken his right fibula and would miss the rest of the season. Despite the injury, it was announced that Samuel could possibly return later on in the season, but he suffered a sprained foot in rehab and would not return. Former Gamecock running back Marcus Lattimore (who suffered severe knee injuries in college) had encouraging words for Samuel following his injury, saying: "I know you are down and frustrated and you feel like your dreams are far away now. They aren’t. You can use this moment to show people how to overcome adversity, the whole state of South Carolina loves Deebo."

2018 season

On November 5, 2017, Samuel announced that he would be returning for his senior season. Samuel finished the 2018 season with 882 yards receiving and 11 touchdowns. His best game of the season came against Clemson, where he caught 10 passes for 210 yards and three touchdowns. He chose not to play in the Gamecocks' bowl game, the 2018 Belk Bowl. He was later selected to play in the 2019 Senior Bowl.

College statistics

Professional career

San Francisco 49ers
Samuel was selected by the San Francisco 49ers in the second round (36th overall) of the 2019 NFL Draft. He signed a four-year contract with the 49ers on July 25, 2019.

2019 season
Deebo Samuel made his NFL debut against the Tampa Bay Buccaneers, catching three passes for 17 yards and losing a fumble in the 31–17 road victory. In the next game against the Cincinnati Bengals, he caught five passes for 87 yards and his first NFL touchdown as the 49ers won on the road by a score of 41–17. During Week 8 against the Carolina Panthers, Samuel caught three passes for 19 yards and rushed for 29 yards and a touchdown in a 51–13 victory. Two weeks later against the Seattle Seahawks on Monday Night Football, he caught eight passes for 112 yards in the 27–24 overtime loss. In the next game against the Arizona Cardinals, Samuel caught eight passes for 134 yards in the 36–26 victory. Samuel would have two more touchdown catches over the next two games against the Green Bay Packers and Baltimore Ravens, and would add another rushing score in the Week 16 contest against the Los Angeles Rams. In the regular-season finale against the Seahawks on Sunday Night Football, he caught five passes for 102 yards and rushed twice for 33 yards and a touchdown in the 26–21 road victory.

During Super Bowl LIV against the Kansas City Chiefs, Samuel rushed twice for 53 yards and caught five passes for 39 yards during the 31–20 loss. His 53 rushing yards was the most by a wide receiver in Super Bowl history.

2020 season
Samuel was placed on the non-football injury list at the start of training camp on July 28, 2020. He was activated on September 5, 2020, but was placed on injured reserve on September 12. He was activated on October 3. He was placed on the reserve/COVID-19 list by the team on November 4, and activated two days later. In Week 12 against the Los Angeles Rams, he had 11 receptions for 133 receiving yards in the 23–20 victory. Samuel finished the 2020 season with 33 receptions for 391 receiving yards and one receiving touchdown.

2021 season
During the season-opening 41–33 road victory over the Detroit Lions, Samuel caught nine passes for 189 yards and a touchdown. In Week 8, Samuel had six catches for 171 yards in a 33–22 win over the Bears, earning NFC Offensive Player of the Week. In Week 10, Samuel had five catches for 97 yards and five carries for 36 yards and two total touchdowns in a 31–10 win over the Rams, earning his second NFC Offensive Player of the Week honor of the season.

Over the course of the season, the 49ers increasingly lined Samuel up in the backfield like a traditional running back, roughly 11% of the time, in order to get the ball in his hands more often and take advantage of his play-making ability. Samuel was elected to the Pro Bowl for 2021. Throughout the season, Samuel had more rushing touchdowns of 10+ yards (6) than 23 NFL teams, He also holds the record for the most rushing touchdowns in a single season by a wide receiver in NFL history, with 8. In a must-win week 18 matchup against the Los Angeles Rams, Samuel threw a 24-yard touchdown pass, ran for a 16-yard touchdown, and totaled 164 yards. Through the air, Samuel finished the regular season with 77 receptions for 1,405 receiving yards and six receiving touchdowns. On the ground, Samuel finished with 59 rushing attempts for 365 rushing yards and eight rushing touchdowns, the most ever by a wide receiver in a season. Samuel also threw for a touchdown. He was named as a First Team All-Pro.

Against the Dallas Cowboys in the Wild Card Round, Samuel caught three passes for 38 yards, and rushed for 72 yards and a touchdown off ten attempts in the 23–17 win.

At the 2022 Pro Bowl, Samuel coined the term "wide back" to refer to his position as a wide receiver that started playing running back midway through the 2021 NFL season. He was ranked 19th by his fellow players on the NFL Top 100 Players of 2022.

2022 season
During the 2022 offseason, it was reported that Samuel requested to be traded; however, he reported to training camp and ultimately, on July 31, 2022, signed a three-year, $73.5 million contract extension with $58.1 million guaranteed.

Against the Los Angeles Rams in Week 4, Samuel had six catches for 115 yards and a touchdown on a 57-yard catch-and-run in the 24–9 win. After Week 7 against the Kansas City Chiefs, Samuel reportedly had a hamstring issue. Head coach Kyle Shanahan called the injury day-to-day. This injury ruled Samuel out for Week 8 against the Los Angeles Rams, but Samuel returned after the team’s Week 9 bye. Against the Tampa Bay Buccaneers in Week 14, Samuel had four catches for 43 yards, including 21 rush yards on 4 rush attempts and a rush touchdown on a 17-yard play. However, later on, Samuel injured his ankle and left the game with no return. It was later reported he was expected to have a high ankle sprain, which could rule him out for the remainder of the 2022 regular season.

NFL career statistics

Regular season

Postseason

Personal life
Samuel was given the nickname "Deebo" by his father, Galen, after the character Deebo played by Tiny Lister Jr. in the 1995 movie Friday.

References

External links

San Francisco 49ers bio
South Carolina Gamecocks bio

1996 births
Living people
African-American players of American football
American football wide receivers
National Conference Pro Bowl players
People from Inman, South Carolina
Players of American football from South Carolina
San Francisco 49ers players
South Carolina Gamecocks football players